Fong Seow Jit (born 10 July 1942) is a Malaysian former swimmer. He competed in two events at the 1960 Summer Olympics.

References

External links
 

1942 births
Living people
Malaysian male swimmers
Olympic swimmers of Malaya
Swimmers at the 1960 Summer Olympics
People from Penang